"Sprinkle Me" is a song by American rapper E-40 featuring American rapper Suga-T. The single was released on May 20, 1995, as the third single from E-40's second studio album In a Major Way (1995). Produced by Mike Mosley and Sam Bostic, it reached number 44 on the Billboard Hot 100.

Charts

References 

1994 singles
1994 songs
E-40 songs
Jive Records singles
Songs written by E-40